Teofil Fabiny (also Theophil von Fabiny) (11 October 1822 – 4 March 1908) was a Hungarian politician and jurist, who served as Minister of Justice between 1886 and 1889.

References
 Magyar Életrajzi Lexikon

1822 births
1908 deaths
19th-century Hungarian politicians
Justice ministers of Hungary
People from Pest, Hungary
Politicians from Budapest
Liberal Party (Hungary) politicians